The 1967 Tour de Romandie was the 21st edition of the Tour de Romandie cycle race and was held from 4 May to 7 May 1967. The race started in Geneva and finished in Sainte-Croix. The race was won by Vittorio Adorni.

General classification

References

1967
Tour de Romandie
May 1967 sports events in Europe